Jonathan Tunick (born April 19, 1938, New York City) is an American orchestrator, musical director, and composer, and one of eighteen "EGOTs" - people to have won all four major American showbusiness awards: the Tony Awards, Academy Awards, Emmy Awards and Grammy Awards. He is best known for orchestrating the works of Stephen Sondheim, their collaboration starting in 1970 with Company and continuing until Sondheim's death in 2021.

Biography
Tunick graduated from Hunter College Elementary School, the LaGuardia Performing Arts High School, and holds degrees from Bard College and the Juilliard School. Tunick's principal instrument is the clarinet.

Much of his work has arisen from his involvement in theatre, and he is associated especially with the musicals of Stephen Sondheim. Sondheim said of Tunick's work: "'I think he's tops'..." and further noted that "Tunick is a standout in his field not only because of his musicianship and imagination, but primarily because of 'his great sensitivity to theatrical atmosphere'".

Tunick also has a band, the "Broadway Moonlighters", which played at Birdland in March 2012 and in 2008 with Barbara Cook as his special guest. He has worked as an arranger and/or conductor on recordings with Judy Collins, Kiri Te Kanawa, Brian Asawa, Sir Neville Mariner, Itzhak Perlman, Plácido Domingo, Johnny Mathis, Barbra Streisand, Paul McCartney, and Bernadette Peters. In his review of the Bernadette Peters recording Bernadette Peters Loves Rodgers and Hammerstein (Angel Records, 2002), John Kenrick wrote: "Jonathan Tunick provides the brilliant arrangements." Tunick won the Grammy Award as "Best Instrumental Arrangement Accompanying Vocalist(s)/Best Background Arrangement" for his work on the song "No One Is Alone" from the Cleo Laine album Cleo Laine Sings Sondheim (RCA Victor, 1987).

Tunick won the first Tony Award for Best Orchestrations that was awarded, in 1997, for Titanic.

In addition to the other awards, he has won the Drama Desk Award for Outstanding Orchestrations three times and won a Drama Desk Special Award in 1982.

Tunick was inducted into the American Theatre Hall of Fame in January 2009.

Personal life
Tunick is married to actress Leigh Beery (also known as "Lee Beery"), who appeared in the television soap opera Dark Shadows in 1971.

Work

Stage
Sources - AllMusic; Internet Broadway Database

Take Five (composer: "Gristedes," "The Pro Musica Antiqua")(Julius Monk Revue) - 1957
From A to Z - 1960
All in Love - 1961
Promises, Promises - 1968
Here's Where I Belong - 1968
Dames at Sea - 1969
Company - 1970
The Grass Harp - 1971
Follies - 1971
MASS - 1971
The Selling of the President - 1972
Sondheim: A Musical Tribute - Concert - 1973
A Little Night Music - 1973
Smith - 1973
A Chorus Line - 1975 ("Opening," "Nothing," "At The Ballet," "...And," "What I Did For Love")
Goodtime Charley - 1975
The Frogs - 1975
Pacific Overtures - 1976
Ballroom - 1978
Sweeney Todd - 1979
Merrily We Roll Along - 1981
Nine - (musical supervisor and orchestrations) 1982
Alice in Wonderland - (musical supervisor)  1982
Baby - 1983
Dance a Little Closer - 1983
The Wind in the Willows - (musical supervisor)  1985
Into the Woods - 1987
Nick & Nora - 1991
Phantom - 1992
A Grand Night for Singing - 1993
Company (re-orchestrated) - 1993
Sweeney Todd (re-orchestrated) - 1993
Passion -  1994
The Petrified Prince - Public Theater 1994
Patti LuPone on Broadway - Walter Kerr Theatre Concert 1995
Company - 1995

A Funny Thing Happened on the Way to the Forum (re-orchestrated; originals by Sid Ramin and Irwin Kostal) - 1996
Martin Guerre - 1996
Into the Woods - 1997
Titanic - 1997
Saturday Night - 1999
Minnelli on Minnelli - (orchestrations) Palace Theatre Concerts 1999
Marie Christine - 1999
Putting It Together - 1999
Napoleon - 2000
Follies (re-orchestrated) - 2001
Into the Woods (re-orchestrated) - 2002
Elaine Stritch At Liberty - 2001
Nine - (re-orchestrated) 2003
110 in the Shade (re-orchestrated from Hershy Kay's originals) - 2003
The Frogs (re-orchestrated & expanded) - 2004
Pacific Overtures - (re-orchestrated) 2004
The Color Purple - 2005
A Chorus Line - (re-orchestrated) 2006
The Apple Tree - (re-orchestrated from Eddie Sauter's originals) 2006
110 in the Shade - (re-orchestrated from Hershy Kay's originals) 2007
Lovemusik - 2007
A Catered Affair - 2008
Road Show - 2008 and 2003
The Story of My Life - 2009
Oklahoma! - (re-orchestrated from Robert Russell Bennett's originals) 2009
Bye Bye Birdie - (re-orchestrated from Robert Ginzler's originals) 2009
Paradise Found - 2010
Some Lovers - Old Globe Theatre 2011
Sweeney Todd (re-orchestrated) - 2012
Passion (re-orchestrated) - 2013
A Gentleman's Guide to Love and Murder - 2013
Waterfall - Pasadena Playhouse 2015
Dames at Sea (re-orchestrated) - 2015
Cabin in the Sky - Encores! 2016
Carousel - (re-orchestrated from Don Walker's originals) 2018

Filmography
Sources - AllMusic; Internet Movie Database

The Twelve Chairs - 1970 - musical director, orchestrator
Blazing Saddles - 1974 - orchestrator
Young Frankenstein - 1974 - orchestrator
The Adventure of Sherlock Holmes' Smarter Brother - 1975 - orchestrator
A Little Night Music - 1977 - composer orchestrator, conductor (winner, Academy Award)
Columbo: Murder Under Glass - 1978 - (television) - composer, conductor
Flying High - 1978 - (television) - composer, conductor
3 by Cheever: "O Youth and Beauty", "The Sorrows of Gin" and 3 by Cheever: The 5:48 - 1979 - (television) - composer, conductor
Rendezvous Hotel - 1979 - (television) - composer, conductor
Swan Song - 1980 - (television) - composer, conductor
Blinded by the Light - 1980 - (television) - composer, conductor
The Jilting of Granny Weatherall - 1980 - (television) - composer, conductor
Fort Apache the Bronx - 1981 - composer, conductor
Endless Love - 1981 - composer, conductor
Reds - 1981 - orchestrator
The Shady Hill Kidnapping - 1982 - (television) - composer, conductor
Night of 100 Stars - 1982 - (television) - music arranger
Sweeney Todd - 1982 - (television) - orchestrator
Alice in Wonderland - 1983 - (television) - composer, conductor
I Am the Cheese - 1983 - composer, conductor
Murder, She Wrote - 1984 - (television) - series composer, conductor
Concealed Enemies - 1984 - (television) - composer, conductor
Brotherly Love - 1985 - (television) - composer, conductor
Steven Spielberg's Amazing Stories - 1985 - (television) - series composer, conductor
The B.R.A.T. Patrol - 1986 - (television) - composer, conductor
American Masters - 1986 - (television) - composer (theme only)
You Ruined My Life - 1987 - (television) - composer, conductor
Into the Woods - 1991 - (television) - orchestrator
Sondheim: A Celebration at Carnegie Hall - 1993 (televised) (concert in 1992) - (television) - orchestrator
The Last Good Time - 1994 - composer, conductor
The Birdcage - 1996 - music arranger and adapter, composer, conductor
Hey, Mr. Producer! The Musical World of Cameron Mackintosh - 1998 - (television) - orchestrator
The Fantasticks - 2000 - music adaptor and arranger, conductor
Find Me Guilty - 2006 - composer, conductor
Sweeney Todd (Tim Burton film) - 2007 - music adaptor and orchestrator
Into the Woods - 2014 - orchestrator
Beauty and the Beast - 2017 - orchestrator

Awards
Sources - Sondheim Guide; Internet Broadway Database
 
1977 Academy Award - Original Song Score and Its Adaptation or Adaptation Score - A Little Night Music
1982 Emmy Award - Outstanding Achievement in Music Direction - Night of 100 Stars
1988 Grammy Award - Best Instrumental Arrangement, "No One Is Alone", performed by Cleo Laine
1994 Drama Desk Award for Outstanding Orchestrations - Passion
1997 Tony Award - Best Orchestrations for Titanic
1997 Drama Desk Award for Outstanding Orchestrations - Titanic
2007 Drama Desk Award for Outstanding Orchestrations - Lovemusik

See also
 List of music arrangers

References

External links
 
 
 Jonathan Tunick Interview NAMM Oral History Library (2021)

Best Original Music Score Academy Award winners
American male musicians
Jewish American composers
Bard College alumni
Drama Desk Award winners
Fiorello H. LaGuardia High School alumni
Grammy Award winners
Juilliard School alumni
Tony Award winners
1938 births
Living people
Musicians from New York City
21st-century American Jews